The American Baptist Publication Society is a historic building at 1420–1422 Chestnut Street in Philadelphia, Pennsylvania.

It was built in 1896 on the site of the former headquarters of the American Baptist Publication Society, which had been destroyed by fire on February 2, 1896. The society was founded in 1824 by preacher Luther Rice and others as the Baptist General Tract Society, which later became the American Baptist Publication Society and eventually the American Baptist Board of Educational Ministries. The society's goal was to use educational means "to disseminate evangelical truth and to articulate sound morals." Its work involved the printing of tracts and Bibles and publishing books and Sunday school curricula. Educational outreach was undertaken throughout many parts of the U.S. in the 19th century, including through colporters and chapel train cars.

The architect Frank Miles Day designed the building in the French Renaissance Revival style, in effect putting a French chateau at the then-top of Philadelphia's skyline.  Together with Price and McLanahan's  Jacob Reed's Sons Store to the immediate west and the Packard Building on 15th Street, the building set the standard for commercial buildings on fashionable Chestnut Street. 
It was added to the National Register of Historic Places in 1980.

References

Further reading

 The First Hundred Years of the American Baptist Publication Society, by Daniel Gurden Stevens, American Baptist Publication Society, c. 1924, .

Buildings and structures on the National Register of Historic Places in Philadelphia
Renaissance Revival architecture in Pennsylvania
Commercial buildings completed in 1896
Rittenhouse Square, Philadelphia